Sathanur  is a panchayat town in Thanjavur district in the Indian state of Tamil Nadu. The town contains the Tirumular Temple, a Hindu shrine.

References

Villages in Thanjavur district